Cabuyao station is a railway station located on the South Main Line in Laguna, Philippines.

References

Philippine National Railways stations
Railway stations in Laguna (province)
Buildings and structures in Cabuyao